Orthetrum villosovittatum, known as the fiery skimmer, is a species of dragonfly in the family Libellulidae. 
Its range is from the Moluccas, New Guinea and neighbouring islands as well as Australia.
In Australia it is found in Victoria through eastern New South Wales and Queensland, north inland Queensland, Cape York Peninsula and north Northern Territory.
It is a common species through most of its range.

Orthetrum villosovittatum is a medium-sized dragonfly with a wingspan of 60–85 mm.
Mature males have dark greyish to greenish-brown thoraxes and red abdomens, with the abdomen constricted at segment four. Young males have an amber and black colouring. Females are ochre-coloured.

Orthetrum villosovittatum inhabits boggy seepages, streams and swamps.

Gallery

References

Libellulidae
Odonata of Australia
Insects of Australia
Insects of New Guinea
Insects of Indonesia
Taxa named by Friedrich Moritz Brauer
Insects described in 1868